David Ochieng (born 7 October 1992) is a Kenyan international footballer who plays as a defender.

Club career
Born in Nairobi, Ochieng spent his early career with Nairobi Stima, Tusker and Al-Taawon.

He joined the New York Cosmos in February 2016, leaving the club ahead of the 2018 season.

He spent the 2018 season with Swedish club Brommapojkarna. On 11 March 2019, he joined AFC Leopards in Kenya on a short-term deal. In July 2019 he signed for Saudi club Al-Ansar.

International career
He made his senior international debut for Kenya in 2012, and has appeared in FIFA World Cup qualifying matches.

References

1992 births
Living people
Sportspeople from Nairobi
Kenyan footballers
Kenya international footballers
Nairobi Stima F.C. players
Tusker F.C. players
Al-Taawoun FC players
New York Cosmos (2010) players
IF Brommapojkarna players
A.F.C. Leopards players
Al-Ansar FC (Medina) players
Saudi Professional League players
North American Soccer League players
Allsvenskan players
Saudi First Division League players
Association football defenders
Kenyan expatriate footballers
Kenyan expatriate sportspeople in Saudi Arabia
Kenyan expatriate sportspeople in the United States
Kenyan expatriate sportspeople in Sweden
Expatriate footballers in Saudi Arabia
Expatriate soccer players in the United States
Expatriate footballers in Sweden